Kapu was renamed Kaup by the British.
Kapu (Kaup) is a town situated in the Udupi district of Karnataka, India. It lies between the twin cities of Udupi and Mangalore, next to the National Highway 66. The villages Manchakal and Shirva are located near Kapu. It is 13 km south of Udupi and 40 km north of Mangalore. It is known for its lighthouse, the three  Mariamman shrines, and the Kapu fort built by Tippu Sultan. Kapu was declared a taluk of the Udupi district by the Government of Karnataka.

Kapu lighthouse 
The Kapu lighthouse was built in 1901 by the East India Company, on the shores of the Arabian Sea close to Kaup Beach. It is 27.12 meters tall.

Religious places 
Sri Hale Mariamma Temple
 Koti Chenaya Temple
 New Maari Gudi
 Shri Laxmi Janardhana Temple, Kaup
 Konkani Mutt
 Sri Vasudeva Temple
 Islamic Dawah Center Kaup
 Shree Brahma Baidarkala GaradiPaniyoor
 Juma Masjid-Polipu

Notable people 

 Sandeep ShettyActor

Gallery

References

External links 

Beaches of Karnataka
Villages in Udupi district
Geography of Udupi district